Axelle Dauwens (born 1 December 1990, in Knokke) is a Belgian athlete who specialises in the 400 metres hurdles. She represented her country at the 2013 World Championships without qualifying for the semifinals. She made her first major final at the 2014 European Championships finishing seventh.

Her personal best in the event is 55.56, set in Brussels in 2014.

Competition record

References

1990 births
Living people
Belgian female hurdlers
People from Knokke-Heist
World Athletics Championships athletes for Belgium
Athletes (track and field) at the 2016 Summer Olympics
Olympic athletes of Belgium
Competitors at the 2011 Summer Universiade
Competitors at the 2013 Summer Universiade
Sportspeople from West Flanders